The Uluguru blue-bellied frog (Hoplophryne uluguruensis) is a species of frog in the family Microhylidae.
It is endemic to Tanzania.
Its natural habitats are subtropical or tropical moist lowland forests and subtropical or tropical moist montane forests.
It is threatened by habitat loss.

References

Hoplophryne
Taxonomy articles created by Polbot
Amphibians described in 1828